Tomas Mikuckis (born 13 January 1983) is a Lithuanian former professional football player.

Career
Career started in FK Žalgiris. In 2006 became member of FK Sūduva.

Played in Russia, 2018 in Latvia.

On 7 January 2019 became a member of FK Kauno Žalgiris.

Also member of Lithuanian national team.

References

External links
 
 

1983 births
Living people
Lithuanian footballers
Association football defenders
Lithuanian expatriate footballers
Lithuania international footballers
FK Žalgiris players
FK Sūduva Marijampolė players
FC Nizhny Novgorod (2007) players
FC SKA-Khabarovsk players
FC Torpedo Moscow players
Russian Premier League players
FC Tom Tomsk players
FK Spartaks Jūrmala players
Expatriate footballers in Russia
Expatriate footballers in Latvia